Ole Gunderson Kinney (June 1, 1858December 26, 1922) was an American merchant and Republican politician. He served two terms in the Wisconsin State Assembly, representing Dunn County, and was elected to the Wisconsin State Senate in 1922, but died before taking office.

Biography

Born in Dane County, Wisconsin, Kinney's family moved to Crawford County in 1860 and then to Dunn County in 1863. He was educated in the public schools. He was a merchant and grain trader. Kinney was president of the Community Savings Bank in Superior, Wisconsin. Kinney served as the Colfax Town clerk and also  served as chairman of the Colfax Town Board. From 1903 to 1907, Kinney served in the Wisconsin State Assembly and was a Republican. In 1922, Kinney was elected to the Wisconsin State Senate from the 11th State Senate district. Kinney had a stroke on October 31, 1922 and died in Superior, Wisconsin, before he took the oath of office.

References

External links

1858 births
1922 deaths
People from Dane County, Wisconsin
People from Dunn County, Wisconsin
Politicians from Superior, Wisconsin
Businesspeople from Wisconsin
Mayors of places in Wisconsin
Republican Party Wisconsin state senators
Burials in Wisconsin
People from Colfax, Wisconsin
Elected officials who died without taking their seats
Republican Party members of the Wisconsin State Assembly